North East Milton Keynes was a county constituency represented in the House of Commons of the Parliament of the United Kingdom from 1992 to 2010. It elected one member of parliament (MP) by the first past the post system of election.

History
Construction of Milton Keynes began in 1967, as a new town. Until 1983, it was part of the Buckingham constituency. As its population grew, Milton Keynes then gained its own constituency, which was taken by William Benyon of the Conservative Party.

Uniquely outside the normal cycle of periodic reviews by the Boundary Commission, the continuing expansion in the population of Milton Keynes led to this constituency being divided in two for the 1992 general election (Milton Keynes South West and North East Milton Keynes).

The new North East constituency was taken by Peter Butler of the Conservatives, who lost it to Labour's Brian White at the 1997 election. White held the seat until 2005, when it was regained by the Conservatives' Mark Lancaster.

Boundaries
The constituency was one of two covering the Milton Keynes borough. It covered the remaining parts of the town of Milton Keynes not in the Milton Keynes South West constituency, as well as the older settlement of Newport Pagnell and the more rural parts of the borough, around Hanslope and Olney.

The constituency consisted of 10 electoral wards of the Borough of Milton Keynes: Bradwell, Danesborough, Lavendon, Linford, Newport Pagnell, Olney, Pineham, Sherington, Stantonbury, and Woburn Sands.

Boundary review
Following the Fifth Periodic Review of Westminster constituencies into parliamentary representation in Buckinghamshire, the Boundary Commission for England recommended changes to the existing Milton Keynes constituencies. Beginning with the 2010 United Kingdom general election, there would continue to be two parliamentary constituencies for Milton Keynes, but they would be formed on a different basis, abolishing the Milton Keynes North East and Milton Keynes South West constituencies after four general elections of use.

Milton Keynes North was formed from the electoral wards of Bradwell, Campbell Park, Hanslope Park, Linford North, Linford South, Middleton, Newport Pagnell North, Newport Pagnell South, Olney, Sherington, Stantonbury, and Wolverton.

Milton Keynes South was formed from the electoral wards of Bletchley and Fenny Stratford, Danesborough, Denbigh, Eaton Manor, Emerson Valley, Furzton, Loughton Park, Stony Stratford, Walton Park, Whaddon, and Woughton.

Members of Parliament

Elections

Elections in the 2000s

Elections in the 1990s

See also
List of parliamentary constituencies in Buckinghamshire

Notes and references

Sources
Election result, 2005 (BBC)
Election results, 1997 – 2001 (BBC)
Election results, 1997 – 2001 (Election Demon)
Election results, 1992 (Election Demon)
Election results, 1992 – 2005 (Guardian)

Constituencies of the Parliament of the United Kingdom established in 1992
Constituencies of the Parliament of the United Kingdom disestablished in 2010
Parliamentary constituencies in Buckinghamshire (historic)
Politics of Milton Keynes